Hamad Ibrahim (Arabic:حمد إبراهيم) (born 18 January 1994) is an Emirati footballer. He currently plays as a midfielder for Hatta.

External links

References

Emirati footballers
1994 births
Living people
Sharjah FC players
Dibba FC players
Al Hamriyah Club players
Hatta Club players
UAE First Division League players
UAE Pro League players
Association football midfielders